The 2022 O Gran Camiño (English: The Great Way) was a road cycling stage race that took place from 24 to 27 February 2022 in the autonomous community of Galicia in northwestern Spain. The race was rated as a category 2.1 event on the 2022 UCI Europe Tour calendar, and was the inaugural edition of O Gran Camiño.

Teams 
Four of the 18 UCI WorldTeams, eight UCI ProTeams, and five UCI Continental teams made up the 17 teams that participated in the race. With one late non-starter,  was reduced to six riders. In total, 115 riders started the race, of which 109 finished.

UCI WorldTeams

 
 
 
 

UCI ProTeams

 
 
 
 
 
 
 
 

UCI Continental Teams

 
 Efapel Cycling

Route

Stages

Stage 1 
24 February 2022 — O Porriño to Vigo,

Stage 2 
25 February 2022 — Bertamiráns to Mirador de Ézaro,

Stage 3 
26 February 2022 — Maceda to Luintra,

Stage 4 
27 February 2022 — Sarria to Sarria,  (ITT)

Classification leadership table 

 On stage 2, Giovanni Lonardi, who was second in the points classification, wore the violet jersey, because first-placed Magnus Cort wore the yellow jersey as the leader of the general classification.
 On stage 2, Erik Fetter, who was second in the young rider classification, wore the white jersey, because first-placed Jon Barrenetxea wore the blue jersey as the leader of the mountains classification.

Final classification standings

General classification

Points classification

Mountains classification

Young rider classification

Team classification

References

Sources

External links 
 

O Gran Camiño
O Gran Camiño
O Gran Camiño